The 2017 New South Wales Cup, or the 2017 Intrust Super Premiership NSW Cup due to sponsorship reasons, began its finals on 2 September 2017 and ended with the Grand Final on 24 September.

Ladder 

 Teams highlighted in green have qualified for the finals
 The team highlighted in blue has clinched the minor premiership
 The team highlighted in red has clinched the wooden spoon

Bracket

Match Details

Qualifying/ Elimination Finals

1st Qualifying final

1st Elimination final

2nd Elimination final

2nd Qualifying final

Semi-finals

1st Semi-final

2nd Semi-final

Preliminary Finals

1st Preliminary final

2nd Preliminary final

Grand Final

References

New South Wales Cup
2017 in Australian rugby league
2017 in New Zealand rugby league